Mariola may refer to:
 Mariola (district), a district in Lleida, Catalonia, Spain
 Mariola (manufacturer), a bass amplifier and loudspeaker manufacturer
 Mariola (plant), a common name for Parthenium incanum, a plant species in the family Asteraceae
 Mariola (wasp), a wasp genus in the subfamily Encyrtinae